Zubko is a Ukrainian surname. Notable people with the surname include:

Denis Zubko (born 1974), Russian footballer
Ihor Zubko (born 1991), Ukrainian footballer
Izabela Zubko (born 1974), Polish poet
Olena Zubko (born 1953), Ukrainian rower

See also
 

Ukrainian-language surnames